The 1967–68 Kangaroo tour of Great Britain and France was the twelfth Kangaroo Tour, and saw the Australian national rugby league team travel to Europe and play twenty-one matches against British and French club and representative rugby league teams, in addition to three Test matches against Great Britain and three Tests against the French. It followed the tour of 1963-64 and the next was staged in 1973.

The 1967-68 Kangaroo tour became infamously known as the "Bowler Hat Tour". Legend had it that a Kangaroos forward had walked through the West Yorkshire town of Ilkley one night wearing nothing but a bowler hat. Although Johnny Raper often jokingly claimed it was him, in 1988 on Brisbane television, Dennis Manteit claimed that he was in fact the man in the bowler hat. At the time, Kangaroo touring teams were housed in the Ilkley Moors Hotel located approximately 25 km west of Leeds in an effort to not only keep down costs but also to keep players out of trouble by being located in a small town rather than a larger city.

The squad's leadership 
The team was captain-coached by Reg Gasnier making his third and ultimately final Kangaroo Tour. Gasnier broke his leg during the first test at Headingley that saw him sit out the remainder of the English leg. He returned to the field in France but in a minor game against Les Espoirs in Avignon, he suffered a further break. This would ultimately cause him to announce his retirement from playing at the age of just 28. He later told in an interview that he never regretted his decision to retire, explaining that he had been playing rugby league virtually non-stop including juniors, junior representative games, the Sydney premiership, interstate games and international tours since the early 1950s, and felt it was about time that he started devoting more time to his family. 

Having led the team in four tour matches in England, Johnny Raper was appointed captain for the Third Test Match against Great Britain. Raper captained the side in each of the three Test Matches in France. 

Peter Gallagher led the team in three successive matches in England, culminating in the Second Test Match against Great Britain. He also was captain against Barrow, Bradford Northern and France B. 

Noel Kelly captained the Kangaroos in five matches, against Cumbria, Oldham, Widnes, Swinton and Pyrenees. Graeme Langlands led the team in two matches (Castleford and Catalans). Elton Rasmussen was captain in one match, against St Helens. 

The Kangaroo tourists were co-managed by Jack Drewes (NSW) and Harry Schmidt (Queensland). Alf Richards accompanied the team as masseur.

Touring squad 
Match details - listing surnames of both teams and the point scorers - were included in E.E. Christensen's Official Rugby League Yearbook, as was a summary of the players' point-scoring, along with each player's age, height and weight. 
The Rugby League News published a summary of the Kanagroos' point scorers. 

Noel Gallagher, Peter Gallagher, John Gleeson, Dennis Manteit and John McDonald were selected from Queensland clubs. Tony Branson and Allan Thomson were selected from clubs in New South Wales Country areas. The balance of the squad had played for Sydney based clubs during the 1967 season.

Great Britain 
The Ashes series against Great Britain saw an aggregate crowd of 53,353 attending the Test series. The largest attendance of the tour came during the Kangaroos 6-12 loss to Wigan in front of 22,770 fans at Central Park on 13 October.

Test Venues 
The three Ashes series tests took place at the following venues.

The Ashes series

First Test 
The first Ashes series test was played at Headingley, Leeds. Kangaroos captain-coach Reg Gasnier suffered a broken leg which would keep him out of the rest of the English leg of the tour while lock forward Johnny Raper would play most of the game with a fractured cheek bone.

Second Test 
The second test at London's White City Stadium saw the Australian's tie the series at one game all with a 17-11 win in front of 17,445 fans.

Third Test 
The Kangaroos retained The Ashes with a hard-fought 11-3 win on a frozen ground at Station Road in Swinton. It would be the 10th and last time Station Road would host an Ashes Test and the 18th and last test match played at the ground.

According to stand-in Kangaroos captain and man of the match Johnny Raper, the Kangaroos had a psychological advantage in the third test after he heard Lions halves Roger Millward and Tommy Bishop say after walking around the Station Road ground pre-match that they did not want to play on the frozen ground. The Kangaroos, used to playing on hard Australian grounds, were in their element against a timid Lions outfit.

France 
During the game against Les Espoirs in Avignon, Kangaroos captain coach Reg Gasnier re-broke the leg he had broken during the first Ashes Test at Headingley. Ultimately this would prove to be Gasnier's last game of top grade football and he subsequently announced his retirement from playing at the age of 28.

|- bgcolor="#CCCCFF"
| Date
| Opponent
| Score
| Ground
| Referee
| Crowd
| Report
|- bgcolor=pink
| 17 December 1967
| France
| 7 – 7
| Stade Vélodrome, Marseille
| G. Jameau (FRA)
| 5,193
|
|-
|- bgcolor="#FFFFFF"
| 21 December 1967
| Les Espoirs (Colts)
| 7 – 17
| Parc des Sports, Avignon
|
| 1,116
|
|-
|- bgcolor=pink
| 24 December 1967
| France
| 10 – 3
| Stade Albert Domec, Carcassonne
| A. Breysse (FRA)
| 4,193
|
|-
|- bgcolor="#FFFFFF"
| 21 December 1967
| XIII Catalan
| 7 – 37
| Stade Jean-Laffon, Perpignan
|
| 3,000
|
|-
|- bgcolor="#FFFFFF"
| 31 December 1967
| France XIII
| 6 – 13
| Stade Municipal d'Albi, Albi
|
| 2,949
|
|-
|- bgcolor="#FFFFFF"
| 4 January 1968
| South West France
| 0 – 15
| Stade Jules Ribet, Saint-Gaudens
|
| 1,205
|
|-
|- bgcolor=pink
| 7 January 1968
| France
| 16 – 13
| Stade des Minimes, Toulouse
| G. Jameau (FRA)
| 5,000
|
|-

First test 

Legendary Australian winger Ken Irvine broke his leg during this game. It was to be his 33rd and final test appearance for the Kangaroos.

Second Test

Third Test

References

External links 
 1967-68 Kangaroo Tour at Rugby League Project

Australia national rugby league team tours
Rugby league tours of Great Britain
Rugby league tours of France
Kangaroo tour of Great Britain and France
Kangaroo tour of Great Britain and France
Kangaroo tour of Great Britain and France
Kangaroo tour of Great Britain and France
Kangaroo tour of Great Britain and France